Aculops is a genus of mites that belongs to the family Eriophyidae that live as plant parasites. Some species, such as Aculops lycopersici, are severe crop or ornamental pests, while Aculops ailanthii is being considered as biocontrol for the extremely invasive tree-of-heaven in North America. Very little is known about this genus, with new species constantly being discovered even in well covered regions such as New Zealand.

Selected species
Aculops ailanthii (Lin-Fuping, Jin-Changle & Kuang-Haiyua, 1997) - ailanthus leafcurl mite
Aculops cannabicola (Farkas, 1960) – hemp russet mite
Aculops fuchsiae (Keifer, 1972) – fuchsia gall mite
Aculops lycopersici (Massee, 1937) – tomato russet mite
Aculops rhois (Stebbins, 1909) - poison ivy gall mite
Aculops tetanothrix (Nalepa, 1889) – willow gall mite

References

External links
 
 

Eriophyidae
Trombidiformes genera